Kaimū was a small town in the Puna District on Island of Hawaii that was completely destroyed by an eruptive flow of lava from  the Kūpaʻianahā vent of the Kīlauea volcano in 1990. In Hawaiian, kai mū means "gathering [at the] sea" as to watch surfing. The lava flow that destroyed Kaimū and nearby Kalapana erupted from the southeast rift zone of Kīlauea.

Before volcanic destruction
Kaimū was located on Kaimū Bay. The bay was world-famous for its black sand beach which was surrounded by shady palm trees. Kaimū was the birthplace of Hawaiian nationalist leader Joseph Nāwahī.

After volcanic destruction
A large section of State Route 130 (Kaimu-Chain of Craters Road) was also covered by the lava. The road is on top of the cooled lava now, with some homes built on top of the lava. There is also the New Beach, black sand like the old, where locals and visitors are bringing sprouted coconuts and planting them to restore the lost trees.

References

History of Hawaii
Populated places on Hawaii (island)
1990 in Hawaii
Beaches of Hawaii (island)
Kīlauea
Black sand beaches